USS Monongahela (AO-178) was a Cimarron-class fleet replenishment oiler commissioned in the United States Navy from 1981 to 1999.

Operational history
Monongahela was laid down on 15 August 1978, at Avondale Shipyards, New Orleans, Louisiana and launched, 4 August 1979. Ships of this class were built with a mast that folded at the AN/SPS-55 pedestal platform to allow the passage under the Huey P. Long Bridge. She was commissioned on 5 September 1981.

Monongahela was the second ship of the Cimarron class oilers and the third ship in the Navy to bear the name.  During her service life the ship has traveled to many parts of the world, including: The Mediterranean Sea, the Indian Ocean, the North Atlantic, the Pacific Ocean and the Caribbean Sea.

In December 1991, she completed an eleven-month "jumboization" at Avondale Shipyards and returned to the fleet as a greatly improved fleet oiler capable of delivering not only fuel, but also ammunition and supplies.

The Monongahela was decommissioned and stricken from the Navy list on 30 September 1999, and berthed at the James River Reserve Fleet, Fort Eustis, Virginia, awaiting final disposal. Her classification was changed on 24 May 2005 as a possible candidate for Foreign Military Sales to Chile.  She was sold to Southern Recycling and scrapped in Amelia, Louisiana on 31 March 2016.

References

External links
Campaign Casuals
Nav Source
 

1979 ships
Cimarron-class fleet replenishment oilers